Rushdan Rusmi is a Malaysian politician. He is a native of Kampung Tok Kayaman, Chuping, Perlis. He was elected Perikatan Nasional MP for Padang Besar in the 2022 general election. He won the seat with a majority of 12,514 votes.

Election Results

See also 
 Members of the Dewan Rakyat, 15th Malaysian Parliament

References 

Living people
Members of the 15th Malaysian Parliament
21st-century Malaysian politicians
Malaysian Islamic Party politicians
People from Perlis
1978 births